Port Jefferson station may refer to:
 Port Jefferson station (LIRR)
 Port Jefferson Station, New York